Newhaven is a town in southern Victoria, in the south Gippsland region. Located on Phillip Island, adjacent to the channel known as The Narrows, it is the town on the island side of the bridge linking Phillip Island to the mainland. At the 2016 census, Newhaven had a population of 449.

The Post Office opened on 1 January 1873 and closed in 1975.

The town's economy is primarily based on retirement living and tourism, and has a fine Yacht Club with marina.  Atlantis Nereus tidal turbines are installed at Newhaven. In 1980, Newhaven College was established and Newhaven Primary School has been situated in Newhaven for a great number of years.

References

Phillip Island
Towns in Victoria (Australia)
Bass Coast Shire